Phạm Thị Yến (born October 20, 1985) is a member of the Vietnam women's national volleyball team.

References

1985 births
Living people
Vietnamese women's volleyball players
Vietnam women's international volleyball players
Volleyball players at the 2006 Asian Games
Southeast Asian Games silver medalists for Vietnam
Southeast Asian Games medalists in volleyball
Competitors at the 2009 Southeast Asian Games
Asian Games competitors for Vietnam
Opposite hitters
21st-century Vietnamese women